The Botswana Independence Party (BIP) was a political party in Botswana that existed from 1962 to 1994.

The BIP was founded in 1962 by former members of the Botswana People's Party (BPP)  and was led by Motsamai Mpho.

During its existence, the BIP played the role of a minor opposition party. The party participated in five national elections (1969, 1974, 1979, 1984, and 1989), but managed to gain representation in the National Assembly only twice (1969 and 1974), both times winning only one seat.

In 1994, the BIP merged with the Botswana Freedom Party (BFP) to form the Independence Freedom Party (IFP) under the leadership of Motsamai Mpho. The IFP won only 3% of the vote and no seats in elections held on 15 October 1994. Soon after, the IFP ceased to exist.

Electoral results 

Defunct political parties in Botswana